Bloemfontein High School (Afrikaans: Hoërskool Bloemfontein) is a secondary school in Bloemfontein, Free State, South Africa.

The school was named after Bloemfontein, the area in which it is located.

References

External links 
 Official site 
 Laerskool 

Schools in the Free State (province)
Afrikaans-language schools